The 1110s BC is a decade which lasted from 1119 BC to 1110 BC.

Events and trends
 1115 BC—Tiglath-Pileser I becomes king of Assyria.

References